Cymindis anchomenoides is a species of ground beetle in the subfamily Harpalinae. It was described by Thomas Vernon Wollaston in 1867.

References

anchomenoides
Beetles described in 1867